My Bondage and My Freedom is an autobiographical slave narrative written by Frederick Douglass and published in 1855. It is the second of three autobiographies written by Douglass, and is mainly an expansion of his first, Narrative of the Life of Frederick Douglass, an American Slave. The book depicts in greater detail his transition from bondage to liberty. Following this liberation, Douglass went on to become a prominent abolitionist, speaker, author, and advocate for women's rights.

The book included an introduction by James McCune Smith, who Douglass called the "foremost black influence" of his life.

See also
Narrative of the Life of Frederick Douglass, an American Slave (1845), Douglass's first slave narrative memoir.
The Heroic Slave, a heartwarming Narrative of the Adventures of Madison Washington, in Pursuit of Liberty, (1852), a fiction book by Douglass based on the experiences of Madison Washington.
Life and Times of Frederick Douglass (1881), Douglass's last autobiography.

References

Further reading
 Bernstein, Robin. Racial Innocence: Performing American Childhood from Slavery to Civil Rights. New York: New York University Press, 2011, pp. 60–63. 
 Chaney, Michael A. "Picturing the Mother, Claiming Egypt: My Bondage and My Freedom as Auto(Bio)Ethnography." African American Review 35.3 (2001): 391–408. 
 Richardson, Mark. The Wings of Atalanta: Essays Written Along the Color Line (pages 21–72). Rochester, New York: Camden House, 2019. 
 Stauffer, John. The Black Hearts of Men: Radical Abolitionists and the Transformation of Race. Cambridge, Massachusetts: Harvard University Press, 2002.  (alk. paper)
 Trafton, Scott Driskell. Egypt Land: Race and Nineteenth-Century American Egyptomania. New Americanists. Durham, N.C.: Duke University Press, 2004.

External links
 
 My Bondage and My Freedom, publicly available e-text at the University of Virginia.
 My Bondage and My Freedom, publicly available at Project Gutenberg.



1855 non-fiction books
Works by Frederick Douglass
Slave narratives
African-American autobiographies
Books about African-American history
Abolitionism in the United States
Books about activists
Books about Frederick Douglass